Nautichthys is a genus of marine ray-finned fishes, sculpins, belonging to the subfamily Hemitripterinae which is part of the family Agonidae. These fishes are found in the North Pacific Ocean.

Species
There are currently three recognized species in this genus:
 Nautichthys oculofasciatus (Girard, 1858) (Sailfin sculpin)
 Nautichthys pribilovius (D. S. Jordan & C. H. Gilbert, 1898) (Eyeshade sculpin)
 Nautichthys robustus (Peden, 1970) (Shortmast sculpin)

References

Hemitripterinae